{{Infobox academic
| honorific_prefix   = 
| name               = Catherine Brekus
| honorific_suffix   = 
| image              = 
| alt                = 
| caption            = 
| birth_name         = 
| birth_date         = 
| birth_place        = 
| death_date         = 
| death_place        = 
| death_cause        = 
| region             = 
| nationality        = 
| other_names        = 
| occupation         = 
| period             = 
| known_for          = 
| title              = 
| spouse             = 
| children           = 
| awards             = 
| website            = 
| education          = 
| alma_mater         = 
| thesis_title       = "Let Your Women Keep Silence in the Churches" (1993)
| school_tradition   = 
| doctoral_advisor   = 
| influences         = 
| era                = 
| discipline         = History
| sub_discipline     = American religious history
| workplaces         = 
| doctoral_students  = 
| notable_students   = 
| main_interests     = 
| notable_works      = 
| notable_ideas      = 
| influenced         = 
| signature          = 
| signature_alt      = 
| signature_size     = 
| footnotes          = 
}}
Catherine Anne Brekus is Charles Warren Professor of the History of Religion in America at Harvard Divinity School. Brekus' work is centered on American religious history, especially the religious history of women, focusing on the evangelical Protestant tradition.

Brekus received a Bachelor of Arts degree in history and literature from Harvard University in 1985, having submitted the honors thesis Women in the Chartist Movement: Historical and Literary Images. She received a Doctor of Philosophy degree in American studies from Yale University with the dissertation "Let Your Women Keep Silence in the Churches": Female Preaching and Evangelical Religion in America, 1740–1845.

Brekus' works have included a history of female preaching in America entitled Strangers and Pilgrims: Female Preaching in America, 1740–1845 (1998) and a history of early evangelicalism based on a woman's diaries entitled Sarah Osborn's World: The Rise of Evangelical Christianity in Early America (2013). She has also edited volumes on The Religious History of American Women: Reimagining the Past (2007) and, with W. Clark Gilpin, American Christianities: A History of Dominance and Diversity (2011). She has been involved in efforts to reprise women's role within American religious history, organizing the first conference on the topic in the United States in 2003.


Published works
Books
 
 The Religious History of American Women: Reimagining the Past. Editor. Chapel Hill, North Carolina: University of North Carolina Press. 2007. . .
 American Christianities: A History of Dominance and Diversity. Edited with Gilpin, W. Clark. Chapel Hill, North Carolina: University of North Carolina Press. 2011. .
 
 Sarah Osborn's Collected Writings. Editor. By Osborn, Sarah. New Haven, Connecticut: Yale University Press. 2017. .

Book chapters
 "Restoring the Divine Order to the World: Religion and the Family in the Antebellum Woman's Rights Movement". In Carr, Anne; Van Leeuwen, Mary Stewart. Religion, Feminism, and the Family. Louisville, Kentucky: Westminster John Knox Press. 1996. pp. 166–182. .
 "The Revolution in the Churches: Women's Religious Activism in the Early American Republic". In Hutson, James H. Religion and the New Republic: Faith in the Founding of America. Lanham, Maryland: Rowman & Littlefield Publishers. 2000. pp. 115–136. .
 "Children of Wrath, Children of Grace: Jonathan Edwards and the Puritan Culture of Child Rearing". In Bunge, Marcia J. The Child in Christian Thought. Grand Rapids, Michigan: Wm. B. Eerdmans Publishing Company. 2001. pp. 300–328. .
 "Female Evangelism in the Early Methodist Movement, 1784–1845". In Hatch, Nathan O.; Wigger, John H. Methodism and the Shaping of American Culture. Nashville, Tennessee: Kingswood Books. 2001. pp. 135ff. .
 "Interpreting American Religion". In Barney, William L. A Companion to 19th-Century America. Malden, Massachusetts: Blackwell Publishing. 2001. pp. 317–333. . .
 "Remembering Jonathan Edwards's Ministry to Children". In Kling, David W.; Sweeney, Douglas A. Jonathan Edwards at Home and Abroad: Historical Memories, Cultural Movements, Global Horizons. Columbia, South Carolina: University of South Carolina Press. 2003. pp. 40ff. .
 "Sarah Osborn's World: Popular Christianity in Eighteenth-Century America". In Wilkins, Christopher I. The Papers of the Henry Luce III Fellows in Theology. 6. Pittsburgh, Pennsylvania: Association of Theological Schools in the United States and Canada. 2003. .
 "Protestant Female Preaching in the United States". In Keller, Rosemary Skinner; Ruether, Rosemary Radford. Encyclopedia of Women and Religion in North America. 2. Bloomington, Indiana: Indiana University Press. 2006. .
 "Introduction: Searching for Women in Narratives of American Religious History". In Brekus, Catherine A. The Religious History of American Women: Reimagining the Past. Chapel Hill, North Carolina: University of North Carolina Press. 2007. pp. 1–50. . .
 "Sarah Osborn's Enlightenment: Reimagining Eighteenth-Century Intellectual History". In Brekus, Catherine A. The Religious History of American Women: Reimagining the Past. Chapel Hill, North Carolina: University of North Carolina Press. 2007. pp. 108–141. . .
 

Journal articles
 
 "Interchange: History in the Professional Schools". With Baughman, James L.; Dudziak, Mary L.; Koehn, Nancy F.; Lederer, Susan E.; Zimmerman, Jonathan. The Journal of American History. 92 (2): 553–576. 2005. . .
 
 
 
 "Religion and the Biographical Turn". With Schmidt, Leigh Eric; Salvatore, Nick; Sutton, Matthew Avery; Applegate, Debby. Forum. Religion and American Culture''. 24 (1): 1–35. 2014. .  .

Other periodical articles

See also
 History of women in the United States
 Protestantism in the United States
 Women and religion
 Women in Christianity

References

21st-century American historians
American historians of religion
American women historians
Christianity and women
Harvard Divinity School faculty
Harvard College alumni
Historians of Christianity
Historians of the United States
Living people
University of Chicago Divinity School faculty
Women's historians
Yale Graduate School of Arts and Sciences alumni
Year of birth missing (living people)
21st-century American women